Zulu Civil Wars may refer to:

 First Zulu Civil War (1839-1840) culminating in the Battle of Maqongqo and the death of Dingane
 Second Zulu Civil War (1856) culminating in the Battle of Ndondakusuka and the death of Mbuyazi
 Third Zulu Civil War (1883–1884), aka "uSuthu-Mandlakazi Conflict", where Zibhebhu kaMaphitha fought against Cetshwayo and the uSuthu